The Lampeter Museum  was founded in 2014 by Hanes Llambed, the local history society, at the university campus.

The museum covers the cultural and agricultural development of Lampeter as well as the history of the college which was founded in 1822. The first exhibition hosted by the museum was about the town during the first world war.

References

Local museums in Wales
Museums in Ceredigion
2014 establishments in Wales
Museums established in 2014